Jacques Derogy (1925–1997) was a French investigative journalist.

Early life
Jacques Derogy was born on July 24, 1925 in Neuilly-sur-Seine near Paris in France. His father, Henri Weitzmann, was a journalist. During World War II, they hid in the Ardèche with members of the French resistance.

Career
Derogy started his career as a journalist by writing for Franc-Tireur and L'Intransigeant. He wrote for L'Express from 1959 to 1987, and subsequently for L'Evenement du Jeudi. During one of his investigations, he uncovered the criminal past of Paul Touvier during World War II. He also wrote about Israel.

Derogy was the author of many books.

Death
Derogy died of cancer on October 30, 1997 in Neuilly-sur-Seine, France.

Works

References

1925 births
1997 deaths
People from Neuilly-sur-Seine
Deaths from cancer in France
20th-century French journalists